Don Jones II (born May 14, 1990) is a former American football free safety. He played college football at Arkansas State.

Early years
Played running back and defensive back for the Hazlewood Golden Bears in Town Creek, Alabama, coached by Aaron Goode. He starred as a guard on the basketball team, coached by Shane Childress. As a senior, Jones won the Class 1A 100 meters, 200 meters and 400 meters in track. Jones ran for 1,869 yards and 22 touchdowns his senior year and had scholarship offers from 10 Division I schools. In July 2007, before his senior year, Jones was timed at 4.38 in a 40-yard dash at the Alabama-Birmingham football camp.Hazlewood High School also has produced former NFL players Antonio Langham, Kerry Goode, Chris Goode, Kalvin Pearson, Joe Manley, and Bob Penchion.

College career
He played college football for the Arkansas State Red Wolves, where he started as a running back for head coach Steve Roberts. While with the Red Wolves, Jones rushed for 149 yards and two touchdowns on 24 attempts and had 12 catches for 146 yards and a score as a freshman in 2009. He then transferred to Mississippi Gulf Coast Community College, where he played safety. He then returned to Arkansas State in 2011, where he moved to defensive back and linebacker.

Professional career

Miami Dolphins
Jones was selected in the seventh round (250th overall) by the Miami Dolphins. His NFL.com draft profile grade was 50.2

Don Jones made a game-changing play for the Dolphins on September 22, 2013, against the Atlanta Falcons in the Dolphins' first home game of the season. Covering a punt on special teams, Jones forced a fumble when he hit punt returner Harry Douglas with 1:48 left in the third quarter. The Dolphins, trailing at the time 20-13, recovered the loose ball and scored a touchdown on the ensuing drive and went on to win 27-23. The victory improved the Dolphins' record to 3-0. He played on the special teams in all 16 regular-season games for the Dolphins, who finished 8-8 and missed the playoffs.
On December 24, 2013, Jones was named to the Professional Football Writers Association's All-Rookie Team as the kick gunner on special teams.

On Twitter, Jones wrote "Horrible" and "OMG" shortly after the drafting of Michael Sam by the St. Louis Rams and was promptly fined by the Dolphins and suspended from team activities. He was required to undergo educational training before he can return to the team. Jones was reinstated on May 19, 2014 after completing the training.

Jones was waived by the Dolphins on August 31, 2014.

New England Patriots
The New England Patriots claimed Jones off waivers on September 1, 2014. He was cut on Thanksgiving (November 27).

Second stint with the Miami Dolphins
Jones signed with the Miami Dolphins on November 28, 2014.

New Orleans Saints
Jones was signed to the New Orleans Saints practice squad on September 7, 2015, and was promoted to the active roster five days later. After appearing in five games on special teams, he was waived on October 13.

Cleveland Browns
Jones was claimed off waivers by the Cleveland Browns on October 14, 2015.

On March 17, 2016, Jones signed a one-year contract with the Cleveland Browns worth $1,671,000. He was released on October 4, 2016.

Houston Texans
On October 19, 2016, Jones was signed by the Houston Texans.

San Francisco 49ers 
On March 10, 2017, Jones signed a two-year contract with the San Francisco 49ers. He was placed on injured reserve on September 2, 2017 after suffering an ACL injury.

On July 25, 2018, Jones was waived by the 49ers.

Personal life
In April 2018, Jones returned to Lawrence County, Alabama, to escort a special needs student to her senior prom.

References

External links
Arkansas State bio

1990 births
American football safeties
Arkansas State Red Wolves football players
Cleveland Browns players
Houston Texans players
Living people
Miami Dolphins players
Mississippi Gulf Coast Bulldogs football players
New England Patriots players
New Orleans Saints players
People from Town Creek, Alabama
Players of American football from Alabama
San Francisco 49ers players